Current Opinion is a series of medical journals published by Wolters Kluwer imprint Lippincott Williams & Wilkins. Wolters Kluwer acquired the journals from the Thomson Organisation in 1997. Each of these journals publishes editorials and reviews within one of a number of medical disciplines.

Journals
The following journals are part of this series:

References

External links
 

Lippincott Williams & Wilkins academic journals
Academic journal series